Terry Huberts (born April 4, 1946) was a Canadian politician. He served in the Legislative Assembly of British Columbia from 1987 to 1991, as a Social Credit member for the constituency of Saanich and the Islands.

References

1946 births
Living people
British Columbia Social Credit Party MLAs
Dutch emigrants to Canada
Members of the Executive Council of British Columbia